Montgomery County is a rural county located in the southern Piedmont of the U.S. state of North Carolina. As of the 2020 census, the population was 25,751. Its county seat is Troy.

History
The county was formed in January 1779, by an act of the North Carolina General Assembly of 1778, from part of Anson County. It was named in honor of Richard Montgomery, an American Revolutionary War general killed in 1775 while attempting to capture Quebec City, Canada.  The North Carolina General Assembly of 1779 named James Roper, James Allen, Cornelius Robeson, Samuel Person, and John Collier of Randolph County as the commissioners of Montgomery County and charged them with determining the location for a county seat. They chose what developed as Troy.

In 1841, the part of Montgomery County west of the Yadkin/Pee Dee River became Stanly County.

Geography

It is situated in the heart of the Uwharrie National Forest.

National protected area 
 Uwharrie National Forest (part)

State and local protected areas/sites 
 Roy J. Maness Nature Preserve
 Town Creek Indian Mound State Historic Site
 Uwharrie Game Land

Major water bodies 

 Badin Lake
 Big Creek
 Big Mountain Creek
 Densons Creek
 Drowning Creek
 Jackson Creek
 Lake Tillery
 Little River
 Pee Dee River
 Rocky Creek
 Spencer Creek (Uwharrie River tributary)
 Uwharrie River
 Yadkin River

Adjacent counties
 Randolph County - northeast
 Moore County - east
 Richmond County - south
 Anson County  - southwest
 Stanly County - west
 Davidson County - northwest

Major highways

 
 
 
 
 
 
  (Possible future business route in Troy)
 
 
  (Mount Gilead)
  (Troy)

Major infrastructure 
 Montgomery County Airport

Demographics

2020 census

As of the 2020 United States census, there were 25,751 people, 10,195 households, and 6,788 families residing in the county.

2000 census
As of the census of 2000, there were 26,822 people, 9,848 households, and 7,189 families residing in the county.  The population density was 55 people per square mile (21/km2).  There were 14,145 housing units at an average density of 29 per square mile (11/km2).  The racial makeup of the county was 69.07% White, 21.84% Black or African American, 0.40% Native American, 1.61% Asian, 0.04% Pacific Islander, 5.75% from other races, and 1.29% from two or more races.  10.43% of the population were Hispanic or Latino of any race.

There were 9,848 households, out of which 31.00% had children under the age of 18 living with them, 55.60% were married couples living together, 12.40% had a female householder with no husband present, and 27.00% were non-families. 24.10% of all households were made up of individuals, and 10.70% had someone living alone who was 65 years of age or older.  The average household size was 2.61 and the average family size was 3.080.

In the county, the population was spread out, with 24.90% under the age of 18, 9.00% from 18 to 24, 28.50% from 25 to 44, 23.60% from 45 to 64, and 14.00% who were 65 years of age or older.  The median age was 37 years. For every 100 females there were 102.60 males.  For every 100 females age 18 and over, there were 100.60 males.

The median income for a household in the county was $32,903, and the median income for a family was $39,616. Males had a median income of $27,832 versus $21,063 for females. The per capita income for the county was $16,505.  About 10.90% of families and 15.40% of the population were below the poverty line, including 19.50% of those under age 18 and 17.80% of those age 65 or over.

Government and politics
Montgomery County is a sustaining member of the regional Piedmont Triad Council of Governments.

Montgomery County is located entirely in North Carolina's 8th congressional district. It was represented in the 115th United States Congress by Richard Hudson (R).

Education
The public school system provides five elementary schools (Star, Mt. Gilead, Candor, Page Street, and Green Ridge), two middle schools (West Montgomery and East Montgomery and one high school (Montgomery Central, formed in 2020 by the merger of East Montgomery High and West Montgomery High). Higher education is provided by Montgomery Community College.

Communities

Towns
 Biscoe
 Candor
 Mount Gilead
 Star
 Troy (county seat and largest town)

Townships
 Biscoe
 Cheek Creek
 Eldorado
 Little River
 Mount Gilead
 Ophir
 Pee Dee
 Rocky Springs
 Star
 Troy
 Uwharrie

Unincorporated Communities
 Abner
 Black Ankle
 Blaine
 Chip
 Dry Creek, Montgomery County North Carolina
 Eldorado
 Ether
 Harrisville
 Love Joy
 Okeewemee
 Ophir
 Pee Dee
 Pekin
 Steeds
 Thickety Creek
 Uwharrie
 Wadeville
 Windblow

Notable people
 Beulah Parson Davis (1896–1948), a fortune-telling witch
 Corporal Henry F. Warner, United States Army World War 2 Medal of Honor recipient

See also
 List of counties in North Carolina
 National Register of Historic Places listings in Montgomery County, North Carolina
 List of national forests of the United States
 List of future Interstate Highways

References

External links

 
 
 NCGenWeb Montgomery County - free genealogy resources for the county

 
1779 establishments in North Carolina
Populated places established in 1779